The African Cup of Champions Clubs 1966 was the 2nd edition of the annual international club football competition held in the CAF region (Africa), the African Cup of Champions Clubs. It determined that year's club champion of association football in Africa.

The tournament was played by 13 teams, with the winner of the previous edition (Oryx Douala) given a bye into the semi-finals. The structure of the tournament was a knock-out tournament with ties played home and away. Stade d'Abidjan from Côte d'Ivoire won the final, and became CAF club champion for the first time.

First round

|}
1 US Gorée withdrew.

Quarter-finals

|}

Semi-finals

|}

Final

Stade d'Abidjan won 5–4 on aggregate.

Champion

Top scorers
The top scorers from the 1966 African Cup of Champions Clubs are as follows:

External links
African Cup of Champions results at Rec.Sport.Soccer Statistics Foundation

1
African Cup of Champions Clubs